Moritz Waldemeyer (born 1974) is a British/German designer and engineer. He trained as an engineer at King's College London and completed his master's degree in 2001. Since then, he has collaborated with many of the world’s top architects and fashion designers including Ron Arad, Zaha Hadid and Hussein Chalayan. His work is a fusion of technology, art, fashion and design.

Collaborations 

Having worked as a research scientist at Phillips, Waldemeyer began his career in design engineering projects such as Ron Arad’s 
Lolita and Miss Haze Chandeliers both of which use interactive LED lights: Lolita displays text messages sent to it, Miss Haze allows the user to create an LED image on its crystal surface via a palm pilot.

Other prestigious projects he has worked on include Yves Behar’s Voyage Chandelier (2005), Zaha Hadid’s Z Island kitchen (2006), FredricksonStallard’s Pandora Chandelier (2007), Hussein Chalayan’s transforming dresses (s/s 2007 One Hundred and Eleven), video dresses (s/s 2007 Airborne), and laser dresses (s/s 2008 Readings).

Exhibitions 

Waldemeyer has recently moved away from collaborative work, making a name for himself as an independent designer. He held his first exhibition, Electric Kid, at the Rabih Hage Gallery in 2006, showing a modern take on the roulette table, Ping Pong table and mirror all using LED lights and duPont Corian. His second exhibition, By Royal Appointment (Gallery Libby Sellers 2007) displayed a revolutionary chair that reads the colour of your outfit and projects your own personal aura of light into the space around yourself.

Commissions 

In 2007 Waldemeyer designed stage jackets with embedded LEDS for alternative rock band OK Go and created interactive mirrors for Selfridges’ Wonder Room. This Year he has also worked on a number of commissions, designing a chandelier for Microsoft Zune that reacts to music sent to it and raising £2000 at the ICA Charity Gala auction with Joyrider: two components that attach to the spokes of a bicycle wheel, emitting a fixed image of a smiley face each using a single LED light.

References

External links 
 Moritz Waldemeyer (Official site)
 Moritz Waldemeyer (Blog)
 Star Tech - NY Times article
 
 PingMag: "Moritz Waldemeyer: The LED Crafter"

1974 births
Living people
Alumni of King's College London
German designers